Momisofalsus clermonti is a species of beetle in the family Cerambycidae, and the only species in the genus Momisofalsus. And its class is insecta. It was described by Maurice Pic in 1950. It s found in Vietnam.

References

Dorcaschematini
Beetles described in 1950